Metron was the son of Epicharmus from Pydna. He was a hetairos and trierarch of the Hydaspes fleet of Nearchus. He may be identical with Metron, one of the royal pages (paides basilikoi).

References
Who's who in the age of Alexander the Great: prosopography of Alexander's empire  by Waldemar Heckel 

Hetairoi
Royal pages of Alexander the Great
Trierarchs of Nearchus' fleet
Ancient Pydnaeans
4th-century BC Greek people